"The Great Louse Detective" is the sixth episode of the fourteenth season of the American animated television series The Simpsons. It originally aired on the Fox network in the United States on December 15, 2002. In the episode, the Simpson family wins a free spa weekend, and Homer is nearly killed when a mysterious figure locks him in a sauna. Chief Wiggum decides to hire someone who can think like a murderer in order to find the mystery assailant. Bart's arch-enemy Sideshow Bob is sent to live with the Simpsons so he can help find Homer's attempted killer, who turns out to be the son of the late Frank Grimes.

Since airing, the episode has received generally positive reviews from critics. The episode's title is a reference to the 1986 Disney animated feature The Great Mouse Detective.

Plot
The Simpsons win a free spa weekend. At the spa, Homer is nearly killed when a mysterious person locks him in a steam room with a wrench, but is saved inadvertently when Krusty the Clown unlocks the door. Homer and Marge see Chief Wiggum, who suggests they seek help from someone who can understand a murderer's twisted mind – the incarcerated Sideshow Bob. Wiggum places a shock bracelet on Sideshow Bob's ankle to discipline any bad behavior while he stays at the Simpson house. Bob asks Homer to list all the people who may want him dead, and follows him around to investigate who the assailant could be. They end up at a repair shop, where Homer chastises the mechanic, Junior.

Homer and Bob go to Moe's Tavern, where Lenny gives Bob advice on how to murder Bart. The assailant shoots at Homer, before escaping in a tow truck. Bob suggests that Homer stay out of sight to be safe, but Homer is named the King of the Springfield Mardi Gras, and must ride on a float for the whole day. Bob is sure that someone rigged the ballot in Homer's favor, but Homer takes part in the parade anyway in hopes of luring out his attempted killer. At the parade, Bob notices a brake line on Homer's float has been cut, and draws a correlation between the wrench used to lock Homer in the steam room, the wrenches in the tow truck and a smudge on the spa invitation, realizing that Junior is the killer. As the float goes out of control, Bob saves Homer by getting fired out of a cannon, hanging onto the Duff blimp, and grabbing Homer with his huge feet from above, just before the float crashes into the Museum of Swordfish.

Homer and Bob give chase on stilts to the killer, who says he is Frank Grimes Jr, the illegitimate son of Frank Grimes, and holds Homer responsible for his father's death. Junior is caught by the police. That night, Bob confronts Bart, having taken possession of the remote for his shock bracelet. Considering Lenny's advice, Bob decides to kill Bart, but realizes that he has grown accustomed to Bart's face and cannot bring himself to do it. He tries to take his leave, but gets zapped continuously by his shock bracelet (because of birds pecking the remote after it landed in their nest).

Production

"The Great Louse Detective" was written by John Frink and Don Payne and directed by Steven Dean Moore as part of the fourteenth season of The Simpsons (2002–03). American actor Kelsey Grammer guest starred in the episode, returning to voice the recurring character Sideshow Bob. Since season three's "Black Widower" (1992), the writers have echoed the premise of Wile E. Coyote chasing the Road Runner from the 1949–1966 Looney Tunes cartoons by having Bob unexpectedly insert himself into Bart's life and attempt to kill him. Executive producer Al Jean has compared Bob's character to that of Wile E. Coyote, noting that both are intelligent, yet always foiled by what they perceive as an inferior intellect.

This is one of the first episodes of The Simpsons that were animated with digital ink and paint, and marked the series' permanent switch to that technique. Previously, episodes had been animated using the traditional ink-and-paint process. Digital ink and paint had previously been used by the animators of The Simpsons for season 7's "Radioactive Man" and season 12's "Tennis the Menace", primarily to test the technique.

Release
The episode originally aired on the Fox network in the United States on December 15, 2002. It was viewed in approximately 8.75 million households that night. With a Nielsen rating of 8.2, the episode finished 23rd in the ratings for the week of December 9–15, 2002. It was the highest-rated broadcast on Fox that week, beating shows such as King of the Hill, Malcolm in the Middle, 24, That '70s Show, and the 2002 Billboard Music Awards. On December 6, 2011, "The Great Louse Detective" was released on Blu-ray and DVD as part of the box set The Simpsons – The Complete Fourteenth Season. Staff members Matt Groening, Al Jean, John Frink, Ian Maxtone-Graham, Matt Selman, Tim Long, Michael Price, Tom Gammill, Steven Dean Moore, Mike B. Anderson, and David Silverman, as well as cast member Dan Castellaneta, participated in the DVD audio commentary for the episode. Deleted scenes from the episode were also included in the box set.

The episode has received generally positive reviews from critics. In 2009, IGN's Leo Waldbaum listed "The Great Louse Detective" at number seven on his list of the "Top 10 Sideshow Bob Episodes". At that time, ten episodes revolving around the character had aired. Canning wrote that the episode "was a lot of fun as it put Bob in an unexpected situation with the Simpsons, interacting more with Homer than with Bart." He added that the episode "is also memorable for having Homer's attempted murderer turn out to be Frank Grimes Jr., son of Frank 'Grimey' Grimes. This was a nice reference to 'Homer's Enemy' and was a rare instance where the series carried through some continuity."

DVD Movie Guide's Colin Jacobson commented that "Over the years, we’ve gotten many a great Sideshow Bob episode, so this one has to live up to steep competition. While not a bad show, 'Louse' fails to live up to its predecessors. It does throw out some good moments, and it’s fine by Season 14 standards, but it doesn’t qualify as a Sideshow Bob classic."

References

External links

The Simpsons (season 14) episodes
2002 American television episodes
Television episodes about murder
Television episodes about revenge